Patricia Girard (also Girard-Léno, born 8 April 1968 in Pointe-à-Pitre, Guadeloupe,) is a French athlete who competed mainly in the 100m hurdles.

Biography
She competed for France in the 1996 Summer Olympics in the 100m hurdles where she won the bronze medal. She also won a gold medal in the 2003 World Championships in Athletics held in Paris in the 4 × 100 m relay.

Girard is the ex-wife of kickboxer Eddy Léno.

Drug suspension 

Patricia Girard tested positive for the anabolic steroid Primobolan and was suspended for two years beginning on 17 March 1990.

Coaching
At the end of 2009, Girard and her companion Karl Taillepierre created a high-level group of athletes which she trained at the Combs-la-Ville track. This group named "Team Patricia Girard" 
became a legally independent association declared in the Prefecture of Seine-et-Marne in February 2012 with its registered office in Combs-la-Ville.
Among these athletes are: Cindy Billaud (since October 2014), Alice Decaux (up to 2011), Adrianna Lamalle (up to 2012), Gnima Faye (up to 2012), Reïna-Flor Okori, Rosvitha Okou, Cornnelly Calydon, Karl Taillepierre, Toumany Coulibaly, Pascal Martinot-Lagarde, Thomas Ravon, Mohamed Koné, Ronald Pognon and Leslie Djhone (since October 2014).

In 2013, Girard was elected Best European Coach of 2012

Competition record

1Did not finish in the final
2Disqualified in the final

National Championships 
 French Athletic Championships
  100m hurdles in 1993, 1995, 1997, 1999, 2001, 2002 and 2003
  100m hurdles in 2008 (13.23s)
 French Indoor Athletic Championships
  60m in 1988, 1990, 1993 and 1995
  60m hurdles in 1993, 1994, 1995, 1996, 1997, 1998, 2000, 2002 and 2003
  60m hurdles in 2009 (8.24s)
  60m hurdles in 2005 (8.08s)

References

External links 
 
 Patricia Girard at Sporting Heroes
 

1968 births
Living people
People from Pointe-à-Pitre
French female hurdlers
French female sprinters
Guadeloupean female sprinters
Guadeloupean female hurdlers
Olympic athletes of France
Olympic bronze medalists for France
Athletes (track and field) at the 1988 Summer Olympics
Athletes (track and field) at the 1992 Summer Olympics
Athletes (track and field) at the 1996 Summer Olympics
Athletes (track and field) at the 2000 Summer Olympics
Medalists at the 1996 Summer Olympics
World Athletics Championships athletes for France
World Athletics Championships medalists
French people of Guadeloupean descent
French sportspeople in doping cases
Doping cases in athletics
Olympic bronze medalists in athletics (track and field)
Mediterranean Games gold medalists for France
Athletes (track and field) at the 1997 Mediterranean Games
Athletes (track and field) at the 2001 Mediterranean Games
Mediterranean Games medalists in athletics
World Athletics Championships winners